Steregushchiy is the lead ship of the latest class of corvettes of the Russian Navy, the . The ship was built by the Severnaya Verf shipyard in St. Petersburg and was laid down in December 2001, launched in May 2006 and joined the Russian Navy on 14 November 2007.

As of early 2023, the ship was reported as likely to undergo a major refit at the Kronshtadt shipyard which would incorporate Kalibr-NK cruise missiles and Redut air defense missiles. The corvette was also to receive a new power plant system during her modernization.

In total, the Russian Navy have publicly announced that they expect to buy at least 20 of these ships, for all four major fleets.

References

Sources 
Russian warfare on Steregushchiy

Steregushchiy-class corvettes
Naval ships of Russia
2006 ships
Ships built at Severnaya Verf